Fleming is a neighbourhood of Rome, Italy. Administratively it was part of Municipio XV of Rome.

Elegant and quiet, it is one of the most expensive residential areas of Rome.

“The sun always shines in Fleming,” is a common expression write by Roman Post.

Origin of the name 
The name derives from the name of Via Fleming, the road that, starting from Corso di Francia, joins the Flaminia Vecchia, via Via Bevagna.

References 

Subdivisions of Rome
Rome Q. II Parioli